Mark White may refer to:
Mark S. White (1851–?), American politician, member of the Florida House of Representatives 
Mark White (Texas politician) (1940–2017), American politician, governor of Texas
Mark White (Tennessee politician) (born 1950), American politician from Tennessee
Mark White (footballer, born 1958), English footballer for Reading
Mark White (British musician) (born 1961), English singer, songwriter, guitarist and keyboardist with ABC
Mark White (soccer, born 1961), American soccer player
Mark White (bassist) (born 1962), American bassist for the Spin Doctors
Mark White (Gaelic footballer) (born 1998), Irish Gaelic footballer

See also
Marcus White (born 1991), Australian rules footballer
Markus White (born 1987), American football player